Live at the Village Vanguard is a 2004 album by jazz pianist Uri Caine as Uri Caine Trio.

Track listing
 "Nefertiti" (Wayne Shorter) – 9:03
 "All the Way" (Jimmy Van Heusen) – 5:21
 "Stiletto" – 7:38
 "I Thought About You" (Jimmy Van Heusen) – 8:44
 "Otello" – 6:33
 "Snaggletooth" – 7:43
 "Go Deep" – 9:33
 "Cheek to Cheek" – 9:10
 "Most Wanted" – 6:34
 "BushWhack" – 6:20

Personnel
 Uri Caine – piano
 Drew Gress – bass
 Ben Perowsky – drums

References

Uri Caine live albums
Winter & Winter Records live albums
2004 live albums
Albums recorded at the Village Vanguard